The Treaty of Greifswald was concluded on 28 October 1715, during the Great Northern War. George I of Great Britain and Elector of Hanover was assured Russian neutrality in his annexation of the Swedish dominion Bremen-Verden, on which he had agreed in the Treaty of Berlin. In turn, George I accepted Russia's annexation of Swedish Ingria, Estonia with Reval and Karelia.

References

External links
Scan of the treaty at IEG Mainz
Annotated edition of the treaty at IEG Mainz

Greifswald
1715 treaties
Treaties of the Russian Empire
Greifswald
1715 in Europe
Russia–United Kingdom relations
Bilateral treaties of Russia